Urooj Mumtaz Khan (born 1 October 1985) is a Pakistani cricket commentator, television host, dentist, and former cricketer. She played as an all-rounder, bowling right-arm leg break and batting right-handed. She appeared in one Test match, 38 One Day Internationals and nine Twenty20 Internationals for Pakistan between 2004 and 2010. She played domestic cricket for Karachi and Zarai Taraqiati Bank Limited.

Early life and education
She was born on 1 October 1985 in Karachi. She graduated from the Fatima Jinnah Dental College and did her MMedSci in Restorative Dentistry from the University of Sheffield.

Career
She played for the Pakistan national women's cricket team, as an all-rounder, and played in the Asia XI cricket team. She participated in one Test match, 38 ODIs and nine Twenty20 matches. She took part in the series against New Zealand women on 10 May 2010. She also played in the ICC Women's World Cup 2009 as captain of the team.

In 2010, she retired from all forms of cricket.

In March 2019, she was appointed to head the all women selection panel. In April 2019, she was part of the selection committee to name the Pakistan women's team for their tour to South Africa. In October 2020, she became the first Pakistani woman commentator to serve as a commentator in a men's ODI cricket match. It came during the first ODI between Zimbabwe and Pakistan in Rawalpindi.

Controversy 
In a television show, former Pakistan cricketer Batool Fatima accused Urooj Mumtaz for axing former Pakistani cricketer Sana Mir from the 2020 ICC Women's T20 World Cup due to personal issues and grudges between the two. However Mumtaz refuted the allegations made by Batool and insisted that Mir was dropped due to inconsistent performances.

References

External links
 
 

1985 births
Living people
Cricketers from Karachi
Pakistani women cricketers
Pakistan women Test cricketers
Pakistan women One Day International cricketers
Pakistan women Twenty20 International cricketers
Pakistani women cricket captains
Karachi women cricketers
Zarai Taraqiati Bank Limited women cricketers
Women cricket commentators
Pakistani cricket commentators
Pakistani television hosts
Pakistani women television presenters
Pakistani dentists
Women dentists
Alumni of the University of Sheffield